The 1979 Major League Baseball postseason was the playoff tournament of Major League Baseball for the 1979 season. The winners of each division advance to the postseason and face each other in a League Championship Series to determine the pennant winners that face each other in the World Series. 

In the American League, the Baltimore Orioles returned to the postseason for the first time since 1974, and the California Angels made their first postseason appearance in franchise history. In the National League, the Pittsburgh Pirates made their sixth postseason appearance in the past decade, along with the Cincinnati Reds. 

This was the first postseason since 1975 to not feature either the New York Yankees, Kansas City Royals, Philadelphia Phillies, or Los Angeles Dodgers. The former three teams would return during the following postseason, and all four would return in the expanded 1981 postseason.

The playoffs began on October 2, 1979, and concluded on October 17, 1979, with the Pirates again defeating the Orioles in seven games in the 1979 World Series. The Pirates won their fifth and most recent title in franchise history.

Playoff seeds
The following teams qualified for the postseason:

American League
 Baltimore Orioles - 102–57, Clinched AL East
 California Angels - 88–74, Clinched AL West

National League
 Pittsburgh Pirates - 98–64, Clinched NL East
 Cincinnati Reds - 90–71, Clinched NL West

Playoff bracket

American League Championship Series

California Angels vs. Baltimore Orioles

This was the first and only postseason meeting between the Orioles and Angels. The Orioles defeated the Angels in four games to return to the World Series for the fourth time in eleven years.

The Orioles prevailed in an extra-inning Game 1 off a walk-off three-run home run from John Lowenstein in the bottom of the tenth. Game 2 was an offensive duel which the Orioles won 9-8 after fending off a rally by the Angels in the top of the ninth after they had scored two runs. When the series shifted to Anaheim, the Angels won their first postseason game in franchise history in Game 3, as Larry Harlow hit an RBI double to overcome a late Orioles' lead in the bottom of the ninth. However, the series would wrap up in Game 4, as the Orioles blew out the Angels, 8-0, thanks to a complete game shutout pitched by starter Scott McGregor.

This was the first of three consecutive losses in the ALCS for the Angels, as they would blow a 2-0 series lead in the 1982 ALCS to the Milwaukee Brewers, and a 3-1 series lead in the 1986 ALCS to the Boston Red Sox. The Angels would not win the AL pennant until 2002, the year when they won the World Series.

The Orioles would return to the ALCS again in 1983, where they defeated the Chicago White Sox in four games en route to the World Series title.

National League Championship Series

Pittsburgh Pirates vs. Cincinnati Reds

This was the fourth postseason meeting between the Reds and Pirates this decade. The Reds won in 1970, 1972, and 1975. This time, the Pirates would return the favor, sweeping the Reds and returning to the World Series for the second time in nine years.

The Pirates stole Game 1 in Cincinnati in extra innings, capped off by a three-run home run by Willie Stargell in the top of the eleventh. They would won Game 2 in extra innings as well, taking a 2-0 series lead headed back to Pittsburgh. Bert Blyleven pitched a complete game in Game 3 as the Pirates blew out the Reds, 7-1, securing the pennant.

The Reds would not return to the postseason again until 1990, where they met the Pirates again in the NLCS and defeated them in six games en route to a World Series title.

As of 2022, this is the last time the Pirates won the NL pennant, and with the Chicago Cubs winning the 2016 NLCS, the Pirates now have the longest pennant drought of any National League team. Aside from the Seattle Mariners, the only team left that has yet to win a pennant, the Pirates hold the longest active pennant drought in the MLB, which currently stands at 44 years.

1979 World Series

Baltimore Orioles (AL) vs. Pittsburgh Pirates (NL) 

This was a rematch of the 1971 World Series, which the Pirates won in 7 games after being down two games to none in the series. Once again, the Pirates defeated the Orioles in seven games, becoming the fourth team in World Series history to come back from a 3-1 series deficit to win the series. 

In Game 1, the Orioles fended off a late Pirates rally to win. The Pirates evened the series by scoring the winning run in the top of the ninth inning of Game 2. In Pittsburgh for Game 3, the Pirates jumped out to an early lead, but the Orioles went on a 7-1 run through the next four innings to take the lead for good and win, and Scott McGregor pitched another complete game for the Orioles this postseason. in Game 4, the Pirates held a 6-4 lead going into the bottom of the eighth, but the Orioles put together an unprecedented rally with six unanswered runs to win 9-6 and take a 3-1 series lead. The Pirates blew out the Orioles in Game 5 to send the series back to Baltimore. Game 5 was the last World Series game ever played at Three Rivers Stadium, as well as the most recent World Series game played in Pittsburgh to date. 

Game 6 started off as a pitchers' duel between Pittsburgh's John Candelaria and Baltimore's Jim Palmer, but the Pirates broke the game open in the seventh and eighth, scoring two runs in both innings to go ahead for good, and closer Kent Tekulve preserved the lead for the Pirates, forcing a seventh game. The Orioles jumped out to a 1-0 lead early, but the Pirates would ultimately prevail, as Willie Stargell hit a two-run home run off McGregor in the top of the sixth to put the Pirates ahead for good, and then for insurance in the ninth, Omar Moreno collected an RBI single, while another run scored when Dave Parker and Bill Robinson were hit by pitches back-to-back, scoring Moreno. Tekulve secured the title for the Pirates in the bottom of the ninth, earning his third save of the series. The Pirates were also the last team to win Game 7 of the World Series on the road until the San Francisco Giants did so in 2014.

The Orioles would not return to the World Series again until 1983, where they defeated the Philadelphia Phillies in five games in the World Series. The Pirates would not return to the postseason again until 1990, losing to the Cincinnati Reds in six games in the NLCS.

References

External links
 League Baseball Standings & Expanded Standings - 1979

 
Major League Baseball postseason